

20th century

solo or solo with tape
Karlheinz Stockhausen
Klavierstück XV "Synthi-Fou", for one synthesizer player and tape
Komet als Klavierstück XVII, for one synthesizer player and tape
Klavierstück XVIII "Mittwochsformel"

duo 
Karlheinz Stockhausen
Wochenkreis, for one synthesizer player and basset horn

electronic keyboard